Michael James McCloskey (born February 2, 1961) is a former American football tight end in the National Football League who played for the Houston Oilers and Philadelphia Eagles. He played college football for the Penn State Nittany Lions.

References

1961 births
Living people
American football tight ends
Houston Oilers players
Philadelphia Eagles players
Penn State Nittany Lions football players